In chemistry, the mole fraction or molar fraction (xi or ) is defined as unit of the amount of a constituent (expressed in moles), ni, divided by the total amount of all constituents in a mixture (also expressed in moles), ntot. This expression is given below:

The sum of all the mole fractions is equal to 1:

The same concept expressed with a denominator of 100 is the mole percent, molar percentage or molar proportion (mol%).

The mole fraction is also called the amount fraction. It is identical to the number fraction, which is defined as the number of molecules of a constituent Ni divided by the total number of all molecules Ntot. The mole fraction is sometimes denoted by the lowercase Greek letter  (chi) instead of a Roman x. For mixtures of gases, IUPAC recommends the letter y.

The National Institute of Standards and Technology of the United States prefers the term amount-of-substance fraction over mole fraction because it does not contain the name of the unit mole.

Whereas mole fraction is a ratio of moles to moles, molar concentration is a quotient of moles to volume.

The mole fraction is one way of expressing the composition of a mixture with a dimensionless quantity; mass fraction (percentage by weight, wt%) and volume fraction (percentage by volume, vol%) are others.

Properties
Mole fraction is used very frequently in the construction of phase diagrams. It has a number of advantages:
 it is not temperature dependent (as is molar concentration) and does not require knowledge of the densities of the phase(s) involved
 a mixture of known mole fraction can be prepared by weighing off the appropriate masses of the constituents
 the measure is symmetric: in the mole fractions x = 0.1 and x = 0.9, the roles of 'solvent' and 'solute' are reversed.
 In a mixture of ideal gases, the mole fraction can be expressed as the ratio of partial pressure to total pressure of the mixture
 In a ternary mixture one can express mole fractions of a component as functions of other components mole fraction and binary mole ratios:
 

Differential quotients can be formed at constant ratios like those above:
 

or 
 

The ratios X, Y, and Z of mole fractions can be written for ternary and multicomponent systems:
 

These can be used for solving PDEs like:
 

or 
 

This equality can be rearranged to have differential quotient of mole amounts or fractions on one side.
 

or 
 

Mole amounts can be eliminated by forming ratios:
 

Thus the ratio of chemical potentials becomes:
 

Similarly the ratio for the multicomponents system becomes

Related quantities

Mass fraction
The mass fraction wi can be calculated using the formula

where Mi is the molar mass of the component i and M̄ is the average molar mass of the mixture.

Molar mixing ratio 
The mixing of two pure components can be expressed introducing the amount or molar mixing ratio of them . Then the mole fractions of the components will be:

The amount ratio equals the ratio of mole fractions of components:

due to division of both numerator and denominator by the sum of molar amounts of components. This property has consequences for representations of phase diagrams using, for instance, ternary plots.

Mixing binary mixtures with a common component to form ternary mixtures
Mixing binary mixtures with a common component gives a ternary mixture with certain mixing ratios between the three components. These mixing ratios from the ternary and the corresponding mole fractions of the ternary mixture x1(123), x2(123), x3(123) can be expressed as a function of several mixing ratios involved, the mixing ratios between the components of the binary mixtures and the mixing ratio of the binary mixtures to form the ternary one.

Mole percentage
Multiplying mole fraction by 100 gives the mole percentage, also referred as amount/amount percent [abbreviated as (n/n)% or mol %].

Mass concentration
The conversion to and from mass concentration ρi is given by:

where M̄ is the average molar mass of the mixture.

Molar concentration
The conversion to molar concentration ci is given by:

where M̄ is the average molar mass of the solution, c is the total molar concentration and ρ is the density of the solution.

Mass and molar mass
The mole fraction can be calculated from the masses mi and molar masses Mi of the components:

Spatial variation and gradient
In a spatially non-uniform mixture, the mole fraction gradient triggers the phenomenon of diffusion.

References

Chemical properties
Dimensionless numbers of chemistry